Heier's Hotel is a historic hotel building located at Indianapolis, Indiana.  It was built in 1915–1916, and is a three-story, five bay, brick building.  It features two tall brick piers and terra cotta cornice-like projecting elements.  The building houses commercial storefronts on the first floor.

It was listed on the National Register of Historic Places in 1986.

References

External links
historicindianapolis.com: Flats Saved: Heier’s Hotel

Hotel buildings on the National Register of Historic Places in Indiana
Hotel buildings completed in 1916
Hotels in Indianapolis
National Register of Historic Places in Indianapolis